Most visitors to North Korea must obtain a visa in advance from one of the North Korean diplomatic missions. All visitors holding ordinary passports (except South Korea) must obtain a visa prior to entering North Korea. All visitors (except nationals of South Korea) who travel to North Korea for tourism purposes require prior authorization from a travel agency registered with the State General Bureau of Tourist Guidance.

Visa policy map

Visa requirement 

North Korean tourist visas are issued in the form of a tourist card for tourists, or on a separate paper for other types of visas. No stamps are stamped inside one's actual passport.

Visa exemption 
Citizens of  holding ordinary passports visiting only the Tongrim County as tourists can stay there using the Chinese ID card in lieu of a visa and passport for up to two days. They may also visit Sinuiju for a day trip without a visa.

Non-ordinary passports 
Holders of diplomatic or service passports issued to nationals of the following countries can visit North Korea without a visa:

South Korea

Nationals of  seeking to visit North Korea cannot use South Korean passports to travel to North Korea. They must instead submit a North/South Korea visitation verification certificate as well as a departure card to the North Korean immigration officer at the port of entry and go through immigration inspection in North Korea. They must also seek authorization from the South Korean government prior to departure.

Statistics 

Citizens of the Russian Federation

See also 

 Citizenship in North Korea
 North Korean passport
 Nationality Law of the Democratic People's Republic of Korea
 Visa requirements for North Korean citizens
 Tourism in North Korea
 Visa policy of South Korea

References

External links 

North Korea
Foreign relations of North Korea